Sir Ardeshir Dalal, KCIE (24 April 1884 – 8 October 1949) was an Indian Parsi civil servant, and later, a businessman associated with the Tata Group. He was knighted in 1946, and was a vocal opponent of the partition of India.

Biography
Dalal was born on 24 April 1884 in Bombay to Rustomjee Dalal, who worked as share-broker. He studied at Elphinstone College in Mumbai, and In 1905 he applied for J. N. Tata Scholarship for higher studies. He received the scholarship, and studied at St. John's College Cambridge. Following this, he qualified by examination to enter the Indian Civil Service, joining in 1908.

Career 
Dalal was initially appointed as a district collector, and served in several districts, eventually serving as deputy secretary to the government of the State of Bombay, and serving as a member of the Provincial Legislative Council in 1923. In 1928, he became the first Indian to serve as Municipal Commissioner of Bombay, serving in that role for three years. 

He was the founder of IIT'S. He joined Tata Group as a Director of Tata Steel in 1931 and served Tata group till 1941 and again from 1945 his death in 1949. He was knighted in 1939.

He was one of the signatories to the Bombay Plan formulated in 1944.

In June 1944, he resigned from Tatas as the Viceroy, Lord Wavell, invited him to join the Viceroy's Executive Council as Member-in-Charge of Planning and Development. His contributions as one of the architects of the Government of India's post war economic plan formulated in 1945 have been noted.

He was knighted again as a KCIE in 1946 died on 8 October 1949.

A hospital-cum-nursing college in Jamshedpur has been named after him as Ardeshir Dalal Memorial Hospital.

Opposition to Division of India
Before the creation of Pakistan, Dalal suggested that for the next 10 years, some "experimental" measures should be taken to address the concerns of the India's Muslim community rather than moving ahead with the creation of Pakistan and if the Muslim populace won't be satisficed with them then it should be "free to seek and work out its own destiny in its own way". He suggested that India should adopt a federal constitution with a parliamentary democracy. He proposed giving 33.25% representation to the Muslims in the legislature and central executive, and reserving some representation for the Scheduled castes and Sikhs. He suggested that the citizens be guaranteed civil, personal, and religious freedom by the incorporation of a fundamental rights charter in India's constitution. He also suggested that the Indian constitution should be under the guardianship of India's federal court and 2 out of its 5 judges should be Muslims. He was of the view that the creation of Pakistan "in attempting to solve one problem, will create many more".

He viewed India as not only a geographical but also a cultural and a spiritual entity. In the words of Dalal,

Dalal believed that the creation of Pakistan would impede this unity and it should be "considered only if no other alternative is possible". Highlighting the primary cause of Muslims' objection to live in a united India under a central government, Dalal wrote,

Notes

References

1884 births
1949 deaths
Parsi people from Mumbai
Members of the Central Legislative Assembly of India
Tata Steel people
Knights Commander of the Order of the Indian Empire
Knights Bachelor
Indian knights
Indian Civil Service (British India) officers
Businesspeople from Mumbai
Members of the Council of the Governor General of India